Keighley East (population 14,929 - 2001 UK census) is a ward within the City of Bradford Metropolitan District Council in the county of West Yorkshire, England. The population had increased to 16,775 at the 2011 Census.

Within the Ward of Keighley East are the villages of East and West Morton and the Keighley suburbs of Riddlesden and Long Lee.

Councillors 
Keighley East ward is represented on Bradford Council by three Labour Party councillors, Stephen Pullen, Doreen Lee, and Malcolm Slater.

 indicates seat up for re-election.

References

BCSP (Internet Explorer only)
BBC election results
Council ward profile (PDF)

Wards of Bradford
Keighley